Simeon Robert "Sim" Wilson III (August 2, 1927 – February 8, 2009) was an American politician and newspaper editor.

Born in Hood River, Oregon, Wilson served in the United States Navy during the Korean War. He received his bachelor's and master's degrees from University of Washington and went to Ohio State University. Wilson was a newspaper editor in Marysville, Washington, who owned the Marysville Globe and The Arlington Times. He served in the Washington House of Representatives as a Republican from 1973 to 1993. He died in Bremerton, Washington.

Notes

1927 births
2009 deaths
People from Hood River, Oregon
People from Marysville, Washington
University of Washington alumni
Ohio State University alumni
Republican Party members of the Washington House of Representatives
United States Navy personnel of the Korean War
20th-century American politicians